Ryan Robert Feierabend (born August 22, 1985) is an American former professional baseball pitcher. He played in Major League Baseball for the Seattle Mariners, Texas Rangers, and Toronto Blue Jays. Feierabend also played in the KBO League for the Nexen Heroes and KT Wiz, and in the Chinese Professional Baseball League (CPBL) for the Uni-President Lions.

Feierabend was selected in the third round (86th overall) by the Mariners in the 2003 Major League Baseball draft out of Midview High School in Grafton, Ohio.

Professional career

Seattle Mariners

2006
Feierabend was recalled from the Double-A San Antonio Missions on September 8, . He threw six scoreless innings over his first two major league appearances before making his first start on September 24 against the Chicago White Sox. He allowed two runs in five innings in his second start on September 29 against the Texas Rangers, earning a no-decision. Feierabend was 9–12 with a 4.28 earned run average in 28 starts at San Antonio.

2007
In  he started the year with the Triple-A Tacoma Rainiers, but had four stints with Seattle. He was 1–6 with a 10.27 earned run average in 9 starts and had 0.77 earned run average in four relief appearances for the Mariners. He was recalled from Tacoma on May 29 and made season debut that night in start against the Los Angeles Angels. He picked up his only win of the season on June 3 against the Texas Rangers, allowing 4 runs on 7 hits while striking out 5 in a career-high  innings. He was optioned back to Tacoma on June 4. He was recalled on July 24 and started game one of a doubleheader at Texas rerecording the loss allowing two runs on six hits in five innings. He was optioned back to Tacoma between games. He was recalled for fourth time on September 1, appearing in five games, including two starts to end the season.

2008
He started the  season with Tacoma, but finished year with Seattle. He made 8 starts with the Mariners. He was named the Mariners' Triple-A Pitcher of the Year at the end of the season.

Feierabend spent majority of the season with Tacoma, going 7–1 with a 2.16 in 13 starts. He struck out a season-high seven batters in six innings in first start of the season on April 3 against the Sacramento River Cats. He went 3–0 with a 1.49 earned run average in seven starts at Cheney Stadium. He was placed on the minor league disabled list with a left elbow strain from May 17 to July 24, marking the first time in his career that he was on the disabled list. He made four rehab appearances with the rookie-level Peoria Mariners and the short-season Everett AquaSox.

On August 17, he was recalled and recorded the loss in season debut that night against the Minnesota Twins, allowing six runs on ten hits in three innings. He picked up only win of the season on September 7 against the New York Yankees. He led the Mariners and was tied for fifth in the American League with six pickoffs, despite only tossing  innings.

2009 and 2010
Feierabend underwent left elbow surgery which forced him to miss the entire  season on March 15. He returned in 2010 to pitch in 25 games over three levels.

Philadelphia Phillies / York Revolution / Cincinnati Reds
In 2011, he played in the Philadelphia Phillies organization. He started 2012 with the York Revolution of Atlantic League of Professional Baseball. He then signed with the Cincinnati Reds organization in June.

Texas Rangers
Feierabend was signed to a minor league contract by the Texas Rangers on January 15, 2013, with an invitation to minor league camp. He was called up by the Rangers on July 12, 2014. He was designated for assignment on August 1. Feierabend elected free agency in October 2014.

Nexen Heroes
On December 3, 2014, he signed a one year/$270,000 (USD) deal to play for the KBO's Nexen Heroes for the 2015 season.

KT Wiz
After being released mid-season by the Heroes, Feierabend signed with the KBO's KT Wiz in 2016. He re-signed with the team for the 2017 and 2018 seasons, and became a free agent following the 2018 season. Beginning in 2017, Feierabend began throwing a knuckleball consistently as part of his pitching arsenal.

Toronto Blue Jays
On February 14, 2019, Feierabend signed a minor league contract with the Toronto Blue Jays. On May 18, his contract was selected and he was called up to the major league roster. That same day, he pitched the Blue Jays' only complete game of the season, in a 4–1 loss to the Chicago White Sox. The game was called due to rain after the top of the fifth, with Feierabend having pitched four innings. He was designated for assignment on May 24, cleared waivers, and was assigned outright to the Triple-A Buffalo Bisons. He elected free agency following the 2019 season.

Uni-President Lions
On January 31, 2020, Feierabend signed with the Uni-President Lions of the Chinese Professional Baseball League. On June 26, 2020, the Lions announced that the organization and Feierabend would officially part ways effective July 1, as he wished to be with his family during the COVID-19 pandemic and didn't agree to the terms of a proposed contract extension.

Lake Erie Crushers
On April 8, 2021, Feierabend signed with the Lake Erie Crushers of the Frontier League. In 93.1 innings pitched across 18 games, Feierabend posted an 8-5 record and 2.80 ERA while striking out 100. On September 6, Feierabend announced his retirement from professional baseball.

References

External links

1985 births
Living people
American expatriate baseball players in South Korea
American expatriate baseball players in Taiwan
Arizona League Mariners players
Baseball players from Cleveland
Buffalo Bisons (minor league) players
Cardenales de Lara players
American expatriate baseball players in Venezuela
Everett AquaSox players
Frisco RoughRiders players
High Desert Mavericks players
Inland Empire 66ers of San Bernardino players
KBO League pitchers
Kiwoom Heroes players
KT Wiz players
Lehigh Valley IronPigs players
Louisville Bats players
Major League Baseball pitchers
New Hampshire Fisher Cats
Round Rock Express players
San Antonio Missions players
Seattle Mariners players
Tacoma Rainiers players
Texas Rangers players
Toronto Blue Jays players
Uni-President Lions players
West Tennessee Diamond Jaxx players
Wisconsin Timber Rattlers players
York Revolution players